Bad Hole Cave is an impressively large rising cave in the Cockpit Country of Jamaica. This is a limestone Karst region that is very rich in caves.

See also
List of caves in Jamaica
Jamaican Caves Organisation

External links
Aerial view.
Photos:
Bad Hole Cave - Jamaican Caves Organisation

References

Caves of Jamaica
Geography of Trelawny Parish
Caves of the Caribbean